Duchess Christiane Sophie Albertine of Mecklenburg-Strelitz (6 December 1735 – 31 August 1794) was a granddaughter of Duke Adolphus Frederick II. She was the eldest sister of Charlotte, Queen of Great Britain; Adolphus Frederick IV, Duke of Mecklenburg-Strelitz; and Charles II, Grand Duke of Mecklenburg-Strelitz.

Early Life 
Christiane Sophie Albertine was born at Unteres Schloß in Mirow in the small duchy of Mecklenburg-Strelitz, part of the Holy Roman Empire, as the eldest child of Duke Charles Louis Frederick of Mecklenburg and his wife, Princess Elisabeth Albertine of Saxe-Hildburghausen.

Biography 
 Christiane and her sisters received a comprehensive education in Mirow, including Latin, Greek and French and tutors such as Friderike Elisabeth von Grabow and Gottlob Burchard Genzmer. Her youngest sister Charlotte married George III of the United Kingdom, whilst two of her brothers, Adolphus and Charles, were regents of Mecklenburg-Strelitz. During his Grand Tour through Europe in 1761, she met John Ker, 3rd Duke of Roxburghe, but as her younger sister Charlotte was already married to George III, protocol forbade them from marrying, and ultimately both Christiane and Ker never unmarried.

Christiane lived in Neustrelitz with her unmarried brother Adolphus Frederick IV and represented him on some occasions. She met Thomas Nugent there in 1767. Remaining in Neustrelitz, in her later life Christiane became a canoness of Herford Abbey. On 13 January 1766 she was made a Dame, 1st Class of the Order of St Catherine. The almond eyes seen in her portraits may indicate that she had a disease of the thyroid, possibly Graves' disease, which causes the eyeballs to expand. Adolphus Frederick died in June 1794 and was buried in the royal crypt at Mirow; Christiane followed on 31 August 1794. Fritz Reuter portrayed her as Prinzess Christel or Christel-Swester in his Dörchläuchting (1866).

Ancestry

Notes

References

Bibliography 
 Grete Grewolls: Wer war wer in Mecklenburg und Vorpommern. Das Personenlexikon. Hinstorff Verlag, Rostock 2011, p. 1770.

External links 
 http://www.landesbibliographie-mv.de/REL?PPN=521517591

1735 births
1794 deaths
House of Mecklenburg-Strelitz
Duchesses of Mecklenburg-Strelitz